Šumiac is a village and municipality in Brezno District, in the Banská Bystrica Region of central Slovakia.

External links
 www.sumiac.sk

Villages and municipalities in Brezno District